Heverlee War Cemetery is a Commonwealth War Graves Commission (CWGC) burial ground for the dead of the Second World War located in Heverlee, Belgium.

The Heverlee War Cemetery was established in 1946 and contains 977 Commonwealth burials of the Second World War, twenty-nine First World War burials relocated to the cemetery, and twelve non-Commonwealth graves (including 11 Polish and 1 American airmen). The cemetery is one of those designed by Commission architect Philip Hepworth.

Notable graves
 Victoria Cross recipients:
 Donald Garland (1918–1940)
 Thomas Gray (1914–1940)
 Leslie Manser (1922–1942)
 Others:
 John Balmer, Group Captain, RAAF
 Lord Frederick Cambridge (1907–1940), Captain in the Coldstream Guards
 Gerald MacIntosh Johnston (1904–1944), Canadian stage and actor and later German POW
 Andrew McPherson (1918–1940), RAF officer who piloted the first English plane to go over enemy lines during the Second World War
 Alec Howie (1913–1940), cricketer

References

External links

 
 

Buildings and structures in Leuven
Commonwealth War Graves Commission cemeteries in Belgium
Canadian military memorials and cemeteries
1946 establishments in Belgium
History of Leuven
Tourist attractions in Flemish Brabant